Richard Allen Kreuger (born November 3, 1948 in Grand Rapids, Michigan) is a former pitcher in Major League Baseball who played from 1975 through 1978 for the Boston Red Sox (1975–77) and Cleveland Indians (1978).

An All-American at Michigan State University, Kreuger posted a 2–2 record with 20 strikeouts and a 4.06 ERA in 17 appearances for Boston and Cleveland. He also pitched for the Yomiuri Giants (1979) of Japan, Triple-A Pawtucket Red Sox (1980), and in the Puerto Rican league for the Criollos de Caguas (1981).

Following his playing career, Kreuger worked as a head baseball coach at Cornerstone College (1995–96) and has done some mission work, traveling to Russia and talked to children in orphanages and to soldiers.  He has also gone on a couple of mission trips with former Cleveland Browns tackle Bill Glass, visiting prisons in Pittsburgh and Florida.

Rick Kreuger retired from teaching Pre-Algebra and Algebra 1 mathematics at Walker Charter Academy in Walker, MI at the end of the 2015 to 2016 school year.

External links

Rick Kreuger at SABR (Baseball BioProject)

Boston Red Sox players
Cleveland Indians players
Pawtucket Red Sox players
Yomiuri Giants players
Major League Baseball pitchers
Michigan State Spartans baseball players
American expatriate baseball players in Japan
Baseball players from Grand Rapids, Michigan
1948 births
Living people
Greenville Red Sox players
Portland Beavers players
Rhode Island Red Sox players
Winston-Salem Red Sox players